Kim Hughes (born 1954) is an Australian cricketer.

Kim Hughes may also refer to:
Kim Hughes (basketball) (born 1952), American basketball player and coach
Kim Hughes (radio), Canadian radio personality
Kim Hughes (GC) (born 1979), British Army bomb disposal expert, recipient of the George Cross
Kim Sullivan Hughes, fictional character on American soap opera, As the World Turns